Entertainment Studios, Inc., also known as Allen Media Group, is an American media and entertainment company based in Los Angeles. Owned and founded in 1993 by businessman Byron Allen, the company was initially involved in the production and distribution of first-run television series for U.S. television syndication. Under the Entertainment Studios Networks division, it also operates a group of digital cable and satellite channels, which broadcast a mix of original programs and the company's syndicated content.

In the late 2010s, the company made several major expansions to its operations, including: entering the film distribution market; acquiring The Weather Channel from NBCUniversal and Bain Capital; partnering with Sinclair Broadcast Group to operate the regional sports network chain Bally Sports via Diamond Sports Group; and its acquisition of television stations from another minority-owned media group, Bayou City Broadcasting.

History 
Entertainment Studios was founded in 1993 as CF Entertainment by Byron Allen. The company was initially focused on producing low-cost, syndicated non-fiction programming, including interview series and court shows (largely scripted from actual testimony). Allen served as host for some of these programs. In December 2003, CF became Entertainment Studios.

Entertainment Studios green-lit its first film and stage projects in December 2011, when it acquired the rights to develop a biographical film and theatrical play on the life of Sammy Davis, Jr. from Davis' daughter with actor/singer, Tracey Davis.

The company ventured into scripted programming in 2012, with the third-quarter launch of the sitcoms Mr. Box Office and The First Family. Both were set for 104 episodes over two years under a model of accelerated production similar to Debmar-Mercury's 10-90 Model. The two half hour shows were picked up as a two-hour weekend primetime programming block with two episodes of each show back to back by Tribune, Weigel and CBS Television Station groups. The company launched its eighth cable channel and first ad-supported service, Justice Central.TV, on December 10, 2012.

Across 2015, the company separately sued AT&T, Comcast and Charter Communications for racial discrimination in being biased against minority run entertainment companies in not carrying its cable channels. AT&T settled in December with the addition of 7 of Entertainment Studios' channels added to AT&T's DirecTV line up. Entertainment Studios added similar suits against Charter and the FCC. The Comcast case, though initially dismissed at the district court, was allowed to go forward by the Ninth Circuit; Comcast was able to successfully petition the Supreme Court to hear its case in Comcast v. National Association of African-American-Owned Media in November 2019.

In October 2015, Entertainment Studios acquired Freestyle Releasing for an undisclosed amount "said to be sealed for high-eight figures". Freestyle also had an output deal with Netflix. The Freestyle purchase was used to bolster an expansion into film distribution, via its new Entertainment Studios Motion Pictures division. Its first release, 47 Meters Down, took in $44 million in box office revenue.

In June 2016, Entertainment Studios acquired TheGrio, a news website focusing on stories of interest to African Americans. In mid-September 2017, the company announced plans to launch an over the top sports streaming service known as Sports.tv.

On March 22, 2018, Entertainment Studios announced its intent to acquire The Weather Channel's television assets from an NBCUniversal/Bain Capital/Blackstone Inc. partnership. The actual value was undisclosed, but was reported to be around $300 million; the channel's non-television assets, which were separately sold to IBM two years prior, were not included in the sale.

In September 2018, Entertainment Studios announced that it had arranged $500 million worth of credit facilities through Deutsche Bank Securities, Jefferies Financial Group, Brightwood Capital Advisors and Comerica. Allen explained that these funds were to be used for further "large-scale" acquisitions, productions, and other general expenses. In an interview with Variety, Allen stated that he was "not a seller", and that he was "one or two acquisitions away from being a fairly large company". On May 3, 2019, it was announced that, under the subsidiary Diamond Sports Group, Entertainment Studios would be an equity and content partner in Sinclair Broadcast Group's acquisition of Fox Sports Networks (now known as Bally Sports).

On May 6, 2019, Entertainment Studios announced that it would expand into television station ownership by acquiring the stations of Bayou City Broadcasting for $165 million, including Evansville, Indiana's WEVV-TV and WEEV-LD, and Lafayette, Louisiana's KADN-TV and KLAF-LD. The stations will operate under the new unit, Allen Media Broadcasting. The sale was completed on July 31, 2019. On October 1, 2019, Allen Media Group agreed to purchase 11 stations from USA Television for $290 million. The sale of the Heartland stations was approved by the FCC on November 22, 2019, and it was completed on February 11, 2020. On August 17, 2020, the company announced its purchase of Hawaii ABC affiliate KITV from SJL Broadcasting for $30 million.

In June 2020, Comcast agreed to carry Entertainment Studios' Comedy.TV, JusticeCentral.TV, Recipe.TV, and The Weather Channel, and to retransmission consent for the Allen Media Broadcasting television stations, as part of a settlement of the Supreme Court racial discrimination lawsuit.

In May 2021, Allen sued fast food chain McDonald's for $10 billion, alleging that the company "intentionally discriminated against Entertainment Studios and Weather Group through a pattern of racial stereotyping and refusals to contract" for advertising across its properties.

In July 2022, Allen Media Group acquired Black News Channel out of bankruptcy from Shahid Khan for $11 million; it was discontinued as a separate service, with its carriage merged into TheGrio.TV.

Television series distributed by Entertainment Studios 
Entertainment Studios has historically been known for its syndicated programs, which are distributed using a bartered model that does not require stations to pay a rights fee. The company sells national advertising inventory guaranteeing an audience in aggregate across all of its programs, and shares the revenue with stations. Allen explained to Bloomberg in 2013 that this business model was attractive to stations that cannot afford to acquire programs from the syndication market, and that "we offer, across all our television shows, probably 20 million to 25 million viewers a week". 

The company has employed various cost-cutting techniques, including using non-union staff, and streamlining productions to reduce their complexity—a technique that also allows it to produce programming at an accelerated pace. A prominent example of these practices are present in the company's court shows, which are dramatized with actors rather than arbitration-based like other popular entries in the genre; Allen explained that with this model, "we don't have the cost of airfare, hotels, security; we don’t have the costs of the claims, the settlements." The studio's first production—Entertainers with Byron Allen—bypassed budget constraints by filming interviews at press junkets, using equipment that was provided by film studios for use by the media.

These practices have allowed some of Entertainment Studios programs to bring in sizable amounts of advertising revenue, even with clearances in lesser-viewed time slots such as late night, or without having produced new episodes in an extended period of time.

Court shows 
 America's Court with Judge Ross
 Justice for All with Judge Cristina Pérez
 Justice with Judge Mablean
 Supreme Justice with Judge Karen
 The Verdict with Judge Hatchett
 We the People with Lauren Lake (2011-2012; 2022-present)

Sitcoms 
 The First Family (September 2012–April 25, 2015) syndicated 
 Mr. Box Office (September 2012–April 25, 2015) syndicated

Game shows 
 Funny You Should Ask
 Who Wants to Date a Comedian?

Syndicated specials 
 Comedy Jam
 Feel the Beat
 Happy Holidays America
 We Have a Dream

Talk and magazine series 
 Beautiful Homes & Great Estates
 Career Day
 Comics Unleashed
 Designers, Fashions & Runways
 Entertainers with Byron Allen
 Global Business People
 The Gossip Queens
 Latin Lifestyles
 Kickin' It with Byron Allen
 Urban Style
 The Writer's Hot List
 The Young Icons

Other shows 
 The American Athlete
 The World's Funniest Weather

Assets

Entertainment Studios Networks

Cable and digital 
 Automotive.TV
 Cars.TV
 Comedy.TV
 ES.TV
 MyDestination.TV
 Pets.TV
 Recipe.TV

Television channels 
 Justice Central, launched December 10, 2012 on AT&T U-verse's family tier.
 Weather Channel Group
 The Weather Channel
 Weatherscan
 Local Now

Allen Media Broadcasting 
Allen Media Broadcasting, LLC is an American television station operating company owned by Entertainment Studios.

On May 6, 2019, Entertainment Studios announced that it would expand into television station ownership by acquiring the stations of Bayou City Broadcasting for $165 million, including Evansville, Indiana's WEVV-TV and WEEV-LD, and Lafayette, Louisiana's KADN-TV and KLAF-LD. The stations will operate under the new division Allen Media Broadcasting. Allen Media made an offer for Tegna TV station group as the third known bidder.

On April 29, 2021, it was announced that Allen Media would purchase 10 stations in seven markets from Gray Television for $380 million, from a divestiture of stations owned by Quincy Media, as a condition of Gray's purchase of Quincy. These are stations where Gray already owned a station, and are mostly in the Upper Midwest. In a separate deal with Gray, Allen has acquired WJRT-TV in Flint, Michigan, while Gray will retain competing WNEM-TV through its merger with Meredith Corporation's local news division.

Television stations 
Stations are arranged in alphabetical order by state and city of license.

Note:

Other Notes:

Television networks 
The following over-the-air specialty networks were acquired by Allen Media Group from MGM Television in October 2020.
 TheGrio.TV, a network focusing on African-American culture.
 This TV, a network that primarily focuses on movies from the MGM library.

Entertainment Studios Motion Pictures 
In 2016, Entertainment Studios began to make major expansions into film distribution; at the Sundance Film Festival, the company made a surprise $20 million bid for The Birth of a Nation, losing to Fox Searchlight. In July 2016, Entertainment Studios signed a multi-year home video and on-demand distribution deal with Anchor Bay Entertainment, covering future theatrical releases by the company. The studio acquired its first film later that month, with the North American rights to 47 Meters Down from Dimension Films. At the 2017 Toronto Film Festival, Entertainment Studios also bought Chappaquiddick, Replicas, and Hostiles. Entertainment Studios aimed to distribute at least 18 films in 2018. In January of that year, on his film distribution model, Allen said:

Diamond Sports Group 

A subsidiary of the Sinclair Broadcast Group operated in partnership with Entertainment Studios, Diamond Sports Group is the mass media company that operates Bally Sports, a group of regional sports networks formerly known as the Fox Sports Networks. The company was founded in 2019 to acquire the networks from The Walt Disney Company, which was required to sell the chain as part of its acquisition of 21st Century Fox.

References

External links 
 
 Allen Media Broadcasting

 
Television production companies of the United States
Television syndication distributors
Entertainment companies based in California
Companies based in Los Angeles
Entertainment companies established in 1993
1993 establishments in California
Privately held companies based in California